Joseph J. Kockelmans (December 1, 1923 - September 28, 2008) was a Dutch born American philosopher and Distinguished Professor Emeritus of Philosophy at the Pennsylvania State University.

References

2008 deaths
21st-century American philosophers
Pennsylvania State University faculty
1923 births
Place of birth missing